Triglochin mucronata is a salt-tolerant herb native to Australia.

Description
It grows as an annual herb that sprawls along the ground, reaching a height of no more than 22 centimetres. It has green flowers.

Taxonomy
This species was published by Robert Brown in 1810. Brown's name has been accepted as sound since publication, but names have twice been published based on specimens of T. mucronata, resulting in the taxonomic synonyms Triglochin calcarata Hook. and Triglochin neesii Endl. It was divided into three variety in 1909, but these have not been accepted.

Distribution and habitat
It occurs in southern Australia, in the states of Western Australia, South Australia, Victoria and Tasmania. It favours saline areas, such as the coast and inline salt lakes.

References

Juncaginaceae
Monocots of Australia
Angiosperms of Western Australia
Flora of South Australia
Flora of Victoria (Australia)
Flora of Tasmania